Qeshlaq-e Amirabad may refer to:
 Qeshlaq-e Amirabad, Tehran